Skakavitsa Peak is the peak rising to 1115 m, the summit of Kondofrey Heights on Trinity Peninsula, Antarctic Peninsula.  Situated in the north part of the heights, 2.08 km northeast of Gurgulyat Peak, 3 km northwest of Mount Reece, 9.93 km south-southeast of Mount Schuyler, and 8.94 km southwest of Mount Daimler in Trakiya Heights.  Surmounting Victory Glacier to the north and east.

The peak is named after Skakavitsa Nature Reserve in Rila Mountain, Bulgaria.

Location
German-British mapping in 1996.

Maps
 Trinity Peninsula. Scale 1:250000 topographic map No. 5697. Institut für Angewandte Geodäsie and British Antarctic Survey, 1996.
 Antarctic Digital Database (ADD). Scale 1:250000 topographic map of Antarctica. Scientific Committee on Antarctic Research (SCAR), 1993–2016.

Notes

References
 Bulgarian Antarctic Gazetteer. Antarctic Place-names Commission. (details in Bulgarian, basic data in English)
 Skakavitsa Peak. SCAR Composite Antarctic Gazetteer

External links
 Skakavitsa Peak. Copernix satellite image

Mountains of Trinity Peninsula
Bulgaria and the Antarctic